Clemente Falsini is a fictional character in the 2012 Argentine telenovela Graduados. He is played by Juan Leyrado.

Character creation
Juan Leyrado played a grandfather for the first time in his career. His character has not been a secondary character, as most grandfathers in telenovelas, and had a prominent role and his own story arcs. Leyrado, aged 60 at the time of the series, said that he was still active in his personal life and played the character according to his own experiences.

Awards
Juan Leyrado was nominated for the 2012 Tato Award as supporting actor in daily fiction.

References

Graduados characters
Fictional business executives
Television characters introduced in 2012